Lars Thelander, born 1942, is a Swedish biochemist. He was awarded a Ph.D. degree at the Karolinska Institutet in 1968. and is a professor of medical chemistry and biophysics at Umeå University.

Thelander is a member of the Royal Swedish Academy of Sciences since 1994, a member of the Nobel Committee for Chemistry since 2006 and the Committees chairman since 2010.

References 

Swedish chemists
Karolinska Institute alumni
Academic staff of Umeå University
Members of the Royal Swedish Academy of Sciences
1942 births
Living people